Barnabus is an alternative spelling, or misspelling, of Barnabas.

Barnabus may also refer to:

Barnabus, West Virginia, U.S.
Barnabus "Barney" Stinson, a fictional character in How I Met Your Mother
Barnabus Manchester, a British homelessness charity

See also

Barnabas (disambiguation)
Barnabus Blossom House, a historic house in Fall River, Massachusetts